Sorghum × almum, the Columbus grass, is a hybrid species of flowering plant in the family Poaceae. Its parents are Sorghum bicolor × S. halepense (Johnsongrass). Sorghum × almum is one of the most valuable livestock forage and fodder crops during summer in semi-arid and sub-humid areas worldwide. It is considered a noxious weed in several US and Australian states.

References

almum
Forages
Plants described in 1943